Saddle Mountain is a large, conical mountain located on the western side of the West Elk Mountains southeast of Crawford, Colorado. Although it has the classic shape of an extinct volcano, Saddle Mountain is an exposed igneous intrusion that geologists call a laccolith.

References

External links
Topographical map

West Elk Mountains
Mountains of Delta County, Colorado
Gunnison National Forest
North American 3000 m summits